Legislative elections were held in France on 6 and 20 May 1906. The elections produced an increased majority for the governing coalition between the Radicals (PRRRS) and the left Republicans (ARD), which had held power under the premierships of Maurice Rouvier and Ferdinand Sarrien since January 1905.

Sarrien resigned on 20 October for reasons of health. Georges Clemenceau, also a Radical, replaced him, and remained premier until July 1909, after which he went on to become one of the longest-serving French Prime Ministers. The Bloc des gauches formally dissolved with Clemenceau's coming to power.

Electoral System
By the law of 13 February 1889 , French legislative elections would take place utilising a first past the post system to elect one deputy in each constituency to the Chamber of Deputies (France), with some arrondissements being divided into multiple constituencies, though most containing only one.

Results

References

Legislative elections in France
France
Legislative